Buena Vista Historic District is a historic neighborhood in East Nashville, Tennessee. It was listed on the National Register of Historic Places listings in Davidson County, Tennessee (NRHP) in 1979.

History
Historic Germantown is Nashville's oldest neighborhood. Immigrants from Germany began to build homes there in the 1840s. The area was established as Germantown in the 1850s. The boundaries of the district are Jefferson Street, third Avenue North, Taylor Street and Eight Avenue North. The area encompasses 18 city blocks. The architecture of the homes in the area includes: Italianate architecture, Stick architecture, Eastlake architecture and Queen Anne style architecture.

NRHP
The District was added to the National Register of Historic Places listings in Davidson County, Tennessee on August 1, 1979.

References

National Register of Historic Places in Nashville, Tennessee
Historic districts on the National Register of Historic Places in Tennessee
Neighborhoods in Nashville, Tennessee
Populated places in Davidson County, Tennessee